Shadoe Stevens is an American radio host, voiceover actor, and television personality. He was the host of American Top 40 from 1988 to 1995. He currently hosts the internationally syndicated radio show Top of the World, and co-hosts Mental Radio, an entertaining approach to UFOs and paranormal topics. He was co-founder and creator of Sammy Hagar's rock station "Cabo Wabo Radio" which broadcast from the Cabo Wabo Cantina in Cabo San Lucas, Mexico. In television, he was the announcer for The Late Late Show with Craig Ferguson on CBS and, as of July 2015, serves as the primary continuity announcer for the Antenna TV network. His voice can also be heard as the voiceover for "G.O.D." in the Off-Broadway musical Altar Boyz. Stevens is also often heard on Hits & Favorites, calling in at least once a week to share wisdom with his brother Richard Stevens and their friend Lori St. James.

Early life
Stevens was born in Jamestown, North Dakota.  He first came to fame in 1957 when a Life magazine article about him, entitled "America's Youngest D.J.", featured a photo of Stevens broadcasting live over radio station KEYJ (now called KQDJ) in his hometown of Jamestown.  The accompanying article extolled the fact that he had built his own working transmitter in the attic of his home the year before, using a "souped-up" wireless broadcasting kit with a hundred-foot antenna. It omitted, however, the additional information that the equipment and advice needed to build the transmitter had both been furnished by the staff engineers at KEYJ, which happened to be owned by his father and uncle; his family continues to own many radio stations in North Dakota to this day, under the Ingstad Family Media group.  He was later "discovered" in a "man on the street" interview by the station and was soon broadcasting a weekly rock show called Spin with Terry.  During his high school years, he obtained a full-time shift at the station as a host of the Mister Midnight program, where he developed his now-famous "slow 'n low" style of speaking.

College and early career
Stevens attended and graduated from the University of North Dakota, where he was a member of Sigma Nu fraternity. Majoring in Commercial Art and Radio/TV Journalism at the University of North Dakota and the University of Arizona, Stevens put himself through college working in radio at KILO in Grand Forks, North Dakota; KQWB in Fargo, North Dakota; and KIKX in Tucson, Arizona, where he quickly became the most popular DJ in town, under the on-air persona of "Jefferson K."  Following college, he joined the Bill Drake-formatted station WRKO in Boston during the winter of 1968-69. At WRKO, he worked the early evening (6-9 p.m.) shift during the station's peak in popularity. In the spring of 1970, he moved to Southern California to another Drake outlet, KHJ, as one of the last true "Boss Jocks", where his big baritone and energetic enthusiasm soon gained a following.  Before long, he gained significant popularity on radio and became the announcer and sidekick on the nationally syndicated television series The Steve Allen Show.

Stevens later went on to become a radio personality and program director at KRLA in Los Angeles. Attaining status as a programmer, he was hired to make a success of KMET-FM and then to create the programming for a new radio format on a new Los Angeles station, KROQ-FM ("K-Rock"), where he remained for five years.

1970s and the rise to fame
During the late 1970s and early 1980s, Stevens gained an additional cult following when he created and produced "Fred R. Rated for Federated," a long-running series of offbeat television commercials for the Federated Group, a chain of home electronics retailers in the western and southwestern United States.  These ads were so popular that they were the subject of a two-page spread in Time Magazine and led to a movie deal, television shows, and American Top 40.

In 1984, Stevens entered an inpatient treatment facility in order to overcome a drug problem that had plagued him since the late 1960s.

Acting career
Stevens acted for the first time when he was coerced into auditioning for Arthur Miller's After the Fall at the University of Arizona. He not only won a role, he got the demanding lead of Quentin, who is virtually never off the stage. One local reviewer said, the young performer "commanded the stage with a commanding voice."
He contributed several deadpan readings of absurd material for The Kentucky Fried Movie and then gained national recognition as the announcer for two incarnations of Hollywood Squares (the 1986–1989 and the first 4 seasons of the 1998-2004 version), appearing in the middle square of the bottom row and guest hosting for a week during the final season of the 1980s version, and guest-announcing during the second "Game Show Week" in the final season of the 1990s run. He also became known for playing Kenny Beckett on the sitcom Dave's World (1993–1997) and serving as announcer for the Fender Bender 500 segments of Wake, Rattle, and Roll. He appeared as himself on an episode of The Larry Sanders Show and also on Caroline in the City. In 1988, he starred in the film Traxx. In 1990, Stevens also starred as the title character on the TV series Max Monroe: Loose Cannon. In 1992, he made a small appearance in the comedy film Mr. Saturday Night. In 1996, he provided the voice for Doc Samson in The Incredible Hulk.

In 1999, he had a cameo in a season 9 episode of Beverly Hills, 90210, playing Sonny Sharp, a former top radio DJ who befriends David Silver.

In late 2005, Stevens was hired to be The Late Late Show's announcer, a position he held until the end of March 2015 when the production contract with then-Late Late Show producer Worldwide Pants ran out at the end of a two-month interregnum of guest hosts. As part of an April Fool's Day hosting swap, Stevens announced for The Price Is Right with Craig Ferguson hosting while Drew Carey with his Price is Right announcer George Gray hosted The Late Late Show on April 1, 2014. Shadoe continues to work with Ferguson as the announcer on the History Channel's Join or Die with Craig Ferguson, and as of February 2017 on The Craig Ferguson Show on SiriusXM radio.

In July 2015, Stevens was named the primary continuity announcer for Tribune Media's classic television subchannel network, Antenna TV, filling a position vacant since the death of fellow DJ and announcer Gary Owens on February 12, 2015.

He is also the author of a series of children's books. The first, released in 2006, was called The Big Galoot.

Personal life
Stevens married his first wife Linda in 1967 (divorced, 1979). He then married Cynthia Gaydos in 1980 (divorced, 1984). Most recently, he married fashion model Beverly Cunningham in 1986. Stevens has three children: one son, Brad, from his first marriage; and two daughters from his third marriage, Amber Stevens West (also an actress) and Chyna Rose.

Amber, appearing in the ABC Family series Greek, made an appearance on The Late Late Show with Craig Ferguson on July 27, 2007, with her father to promote the show.  As a child, she also made a cameo appearance with her father on American Top 40 the weekend of December 24, 1988, as part of a Christmas skit.

Stevens' brother, Richard, who occasionally filled in for him on the 1986-89 version of Hollywood Squares, is a disc jockey on Citadel Media's Hits & Favorites format.

See also
Amber Stevens West, daughter
List of Sigma Nu brothers

References

External links

Shadoe's publishing company

1947 births
Living people
Game show announcers
People from Jamestown, North Dakota
American male television actors
American radio DJs
American Top 40
University of North Dakota alumni
Male actors from North Dakota
20th-century American male actors
21st-century American male actors
The Late Late Show with Craig Ferguson
People from Stutsman County, North Dakota
Radio personalities from Los Angeles